The Commission des Sciences et des Arts (Commission of the Sciences and Arts) was a French scientific and artistic institute. Established on 16 March 1798, it consisted of 167 members, of which all but 16 joined Napoleon Bonaparte's conquest of Egypt and produced the Description de l'Égypte (published in 37 Books from 1809 to around 1829). More than half were engineers and technicians, including 21 mathematicians, 3 astronomers, 17 civil engineers, 13 naturalists and mining engineers, geographers, 3 gunpowder engineers, 4 architects, 8 artists, 10 mechanical artists, 1 sculptor, 15 interpreters, 10 men of letters, 22 printers in Latin, Greek and Arabic characters. Bonaparte organised his scientific 'corps' like an army, dividing its members into 5 categories and assigning to each member a military rank and a defined military role (supply, billeting) beyond his scientific function.

Members 
Some members, like Geoffroy Saint-Hilaire, Monge, or Vivant Denon, are universally remembered but most have been all but forgotten. Some became members of the Institut d'Egypte.

 Pierre-Onésime Adnès the elder (1760–1819), mechanic
 Simon-Onésime Adnès, (1780–1820), mechanic
 François Sébastien Aimé (1762–1843), mechanic
 Bertrand Alibert (1775–1808), polytechnician (X 1794), engineer of the Ponts et Chaussées
 Felice Ansiglioni, printer (Oriental section)
 Antoine-Vincent Arnault (1766–1834), writer
 Pierre Arnollet (1776–1857), polytechnician (X 1796), engineer of the Ponts et Chaussées
 Charles-Louis Balzac (1752–1820), architect
 Pierre Joseph de Beauchamp (1752–1801), astronomer and diplomat
 Beaudoin, printer (French section)
 B. Belletête (1778–1808), orientalist and interpreter
 Denis Samuel Bernard (1776–1853), polytechnician (X 1794), engineer of the Ponts et Chaussées
 Claude Louis Berthollet (1748–1822), chemist
 Jacques Antoine Bertre (1776–1834), polytechnician (X 1794), geographical engineer
 Julien Bessières (1777–1840), surgeon
 Besson, printer (French section)
 Louis Victor Bodard (1765–1799), engineer of the Ponts et Chaussées
 A.-N.-F. Bonjean (1775–1845), marine engineer
 Mathurin-François Boucher (1778–1851), polytechnician (X 1794), ingénieur du génie maritime
 Jean-Baptiste Pierre Boudet (1748–1828), pharmacist in chief
 Boulanger, printer (French section)
 L. S. Bourgeois
 Boyer, printer (French section)
 Damien Bracevich (died 1830), interpreter
 Maximilien de Caffarelli du Falga, general
 Caquet (died 1799), artist
 Philippe Joseph Marie Caristie (1775–1852), polytechnicien (X 1794), engineer of the Ponts et Chaussées
 Jean-Jacques Castex (1731–1822), sculptor
 François-Charles Cécile (1766–1840), mechanic
 comte Jacques Joseph Gaspard Antoine Chabrol de Volvic (1773–1843), polytechnician (X 1794), engineer of the Ponts et Chaussées
 père Jacques-Pierre Champy (1744–1816), chemist
 Nicolas Champy (1776–1801), polytechnicien (X 1794), chemist
 Jean-Siméon Champy (1778–1845), polytechnicien (X 1794), gunpowder commissaire
 Jean François Chaumont (1774–1856), polytechnicien (X 1795), marine engineer
 Callixte-Victor Cirot (died 1801), mechanic
 Jean Colin (died 1801), mechanic
 H. V. Collet-Descotils (1773–1815), chemist
 Nicolas-Jacques Conté (1755–1805), director of mechanics
 Ernest Coquebert de Monbret (1780–1801), botanist
 Jean Baptiste Corabœuf (1777–1859), polytechnician (X 1794), capitaine en premier dans le corps des ingénieurs géographes
 Louis Alexandre de Corancez (1770–1832), geometer
 Pierre Louis Antoine Cordier (1777–1861), mineralogist
 Louis Costaz (1767–1842), geometer
 Jean-Marie-Joseph Coutelle (1748–1835), adjunct to the director of mechanics
 Couvreur, mechanic
 Jacques-Denis Delaporte (1777–1861), orientalist
 Dominique Vivant Denon (1747–1825), writer, artist
 Desfours, mechanic
 A. J. Dewèvre (1775–1799), surgeon
 Déodat Gratet de Dolomieu (1750–1801), mineralogist and geologist
 G. de Dominicis, printer (Oriental section)
 Antoine Dubois (1756–1837), doctor
 Isidore Dubois (born 1782), surgeon
 Nicolas Dubois (born 1776), polytechnician (X 1794), printer (French section)
 Jean-Marie Dubois-Aymé (1779–1846), engineer of the Ponts et Chaussées
 Louis Duchanoy (1781–1847), engineer of the Ponts et Chaussées
 Jacques Auguste Dulion (1776–1798), polytechnician (X 1795)
 Victor Dupuis (1777–1861), polytechnician (X 1794), ingénieur géographe
 André Dutertre (1753–1842), painter
 Léonard Duval (1768–1798), engineer of the Ponts et Chaussées
 Ch. M. Eberhardt (born 1782), printer (French section)
 Elias Fatalla, head of the printer (Oriental section)
 J.-P. Faurie (1760–1799), geographical engineer
 Louis Joseph Favier (1776–1855), polytechnician (X 1796), engineer of the Ponts et Chaussées
 Hervé Charles Antoine Faye (1763–1825), engineer of the Ponts et Chaussées
 J.-L. Féraud (1750–1809)
 Jean Baptiste Simon Fèvre (1775–1850), polytechnician (X 1794), engineer of the Ponts et Chaussées
 Pierre Denis Fouquet, artist
 Joseph Fourier (1768–1830), geometer
 Antoine Galland (1763–1851), printer (French section)
 Étienne Geoffroy Saint-Hilaire (1772–1844), naturalist
 Alexandre Sébastien Gérard (1779–1853), polytechnician (X 1798), naturalist
 Pierre-Simon Girard (1765–1835), chief engineer of the Ponts et Chaussées
 Alexis Gloutier (1758–1800), administrator
 Philippe Greslé (1776–1846), polytechnician (X 1795), shipbuilder
 Jean Charles Hassenfratz (1766–1834), mechanic
 François Michel Hérault (died 1800), mechanic
 Jean-Baptiste Hochu (born 1775), mechanic
 Pierre Jacotin (1765–1827), geographical engineer
 Jardin, printer (French section)
 Pierre Amédée Jaubert (1779–1847), orientalist and interpreter
 Jean-Baptiste Prosper Jollois (1776–1842), polytechnician (X 1794), engineer of the Ponts et Chaussées, entrusted with the hydraulic works in the Nile Delta
 Louis Auguste Joly (1774–1798), painter
 Edme François Jomard (1777–1862), polytechnician (X 1794), geographical engineer and archaeologist
 Jean-Baptiste Jomard (1780–1868), student geographical engineer
 Jean Joseph Labâte (1766–1835), doctor
 Jean-Baptiste Lacipière (born 1776), surgeon
 Michel Ange Lancret (1774–1807), polytechnician (X 1794), engineer of the Ponts et Chaussées
 X. Laporte (died 1799), printer (French section)
 François Laroche (1778–1806), polytechnician (X 1795), geographical engineer
 Le Brun (died 1801)
 Bienheureux Lecesne (1772–1827), geographical engineer
 Louis Marie Leduc (born 1772), antiquary
 Pierre Eustache Leduc (died 1799), geographical engineer
 Lenoble, interprètre
 Pierre Lenoir (1776–1827), mechanic
 Jean-Baptiste Lepère (1761–1844), architect
 Gratien Le Père (1769–1832), chief engineer of the Ponts et Chaussées
 Jacques-Marie Le Père (1763–1841), chief engineer of the Ponts et Chaussées
 Lerouge (died 1801), chemist
 Lethioux, printer (French section)
 J. F. L. Levesque (born 1760), geographical engineer
 Santi Jean-Baptiste L'Homaca, interpreter
 Amable Nicolas Lhomond (1770–1854), mechanic
 F. Maccagni (1763–1846), printer (Oriental section)
 Jean-Joseph Marcel (1776–1854), director of printers
 Marlet, printer (French section)
 Pierre-Denis Martin (1771–1855), engineer of the Ponts et Chaussées
 Jérôme Isaac Méchain (1778–1851), astronome
 Antonio Mesabki, imprimeur section orientale
 Benoît Marie Moline de Saint-Yon (1780–1842), polytechnician (X 1794), engineer of the Ponts et Chaussées
 Gaspard Monge, comte de Péluse (1746–1818), mathematician
 Hippolyte Nectoux (1759–1836), botanist
 Charles Norry (1756–1832), architect
 Nicolas-Antoine Nouet (1740–1811), astronomer
 Panhusen (died 1798), orientalist and interpreter
 François-Auguste Parseval-Grandmaison (1759–1834), writer
 L. Pellegrini, printer (Oriental section)
 Charles Plazanet (1773–1868), mechanic
 Paul Nicaise Pottier (1778–1842), polytechnician (X 1794), engineer of the Ponts et Chaussées
 Roland Victor Pottier (1775- ?), polytechnician (X 1795), ingénieur géographe
 François Pouqueville (1770–1838), surgeon
 Pourlier, antiquary
 Jean Constantin Protain (1769–1837), architect
 J.-J. Puntis (1758–1812), printer (French section)
 François Marie Quenot (born 1761), astronomer
 Alire Raffeneau-Delile (1778–1850), botanist
 Adrien Raffeneau-Delile (1773–1843), engineer of the Ponts et Chaussées
 Louis Rémy Raige (1777–1810), orientalist
 Henri-Joseph Redouté (1766–1852), painter
 Michel-Louis-Étienne Regnaud de Saint-Jean d'Angély (1762–1819), politician
 Joseph Angélique Sébastien Regnault (1776–1823), polytechnicien (X 1794), engineer of the Ponts et Chaussées, adjunct to Bertholet and entrusted with controlling the currency in Cairo
 G. Renno (1777–1848), printer (Oriental section)
 Henri Jean Rigel (1772–1852), compositor
 Michel Rigo (1770–1815), painter
 Louis Ripault (1775–1823), antiquary
 Rivet, printer (French section)
 Alexandre Roguin (born 1771), pharmacist
 N. Roselli, printer (French section)
 Pierre Charles Rouyer (1769–1831), pharmacist
 François Michel de Rozière (1773–1842), mining engineer
 C. Ruga, printer (Oriental section)
 Alexandre de Saint-Genis (1772–1834), polytechnician (X 1794), engineer of the Ponts et Chaussées
 André Louis de Saint-Simon (died 1799), knight of Malta
 Marie Jules César Lelorgne de Savigny (1777–1851), zoologist
 Pierre Simonel (died 1810), geographical engineer
 Jean-Lambert Tallien (1767–1820), National Convention member
 Dominique Testevuide (1735–1798), chief geographical engineer
 Claude François Thévenod (1772–1798), polytechnicien (X 1794), engineer of the Ponts et Chaussées
 Jean Michel de Venture de Paradis (1739–1799), chief interpreter
 Very, printer (French section)
 Jacques Antoine Viard (1783–1849), student of the École nationale des ponts et chaussées
 René Édouard de Villiers du Terrage (1780–1855), polytechnician (X 1794), inspector general of the Ponts et Chaussées, employed in leveling the Suez isthmus
 Guillaume André Villoteau (1759–1839), musicographer
 Jean Pierre Séraphin Vincent (1779–1818), polytechnician (X 1796), marine engineer
 Louis Vincent (born 1780), engineer of the Ponts et Chaussées

 
Egyptology
French campaign in Egypt and Syria
1798 establishments in France
Organizations established in 1798